is a Japanese politician and current governor of Shimane Prefecture.

Political career 
He ran for office as an independent during the Shimane gubernatorial election in 2019, winning 43.58% of the vote.

In February 2020, he criticized South Korea over territorial disputes in the Liancourt Rocks, which Japan claims is as a part of Shimane Prefecture. Maruyama said the ROK government is “strengthening movements to make the occupation of Takeshima (Liancourt Rocks) an established fact”. He also called on the central Japanese government to give an effective response regarding the Liancourt Rocks dispute.

References 

Japanese politicians
People from Fukuoka Prefecture
1970 births
Living people